The 1978–79 William & Mary Tribe men's basketball team represented the College of William & Mary in intercollegiate basketball during the 1978–79 season. Under the second year of head coach Bruce Parkhill, the team finished the season 9–17. This was the 74th season of the collegiate basketball program at William & Mary. William & Mary's home games were played at William & Mary Hall. For the second consecutive season, the Tribe played as an Independent.  As such, they did not quality for any postseason tournaments.

Starting in 1978, William & Mary athletic teams dropped the nickname Indians in favor of the Tribe.

Schedule

|-
!colspan=9 style="background:#006400; color:#FFD700;"| Regular season

Source

References

William & Mary Tribe men's basketball seasons
William And Mary
William and Mary Tribe Men's Basketball Team
William and Mary Tribe Men's Basketball Team